Charles Davis (born 29 September 1946 in Sydney, Australia) is a jazz flautist, currently living in Germany.

Recordings
 1983 – Folkjazz Duo – Charles Davis and Stefan Schmidt
 1985 – Acoustic Works – Charles Davis and Stefan Schmidt – (Chef Records)
 1987 – Blues bis Bossa – Acoustic Duo
 1988 – Captured Moments – Charles Davis and Andreas Piesch – (Chef Records)
 1991 – Nomadic Instincts – Charles Davis – (L+R Records)
 1993 – Influtenza – Four or more Flutes – (L+R Records)
 1995 – Strange Goodbyes – Charles Davis and Captured Moments – (L+R Records)
 1999 – Back to the Flutes – Four or more Flutes – (KlangRäume Records)
 2000 – Key Stories – Charles Davis and Captured Moments – (KlangRäume Records)
 2001 – Spirit of the House – Ensemble Chanchala – (KlangRäume Records)
 2003 – Lines – Duo Bubachala
 2005 – Fluturistic – Four or more Flutes – (KlangRäume Records)
 2006 – The Day the Swallows Came – Ensemble Chanchala – (KlangRäume Records)
 2008 – Pathways – Charles Davis and Captured Moments – (Tonsee Records)
 2012 – Ragastan – Duo Bubachala – (Tonsee Records) 
 2015 – Nexxt – Charles Davis & Captured Moments – (Tonsee Records)

References

External links
 Homepage of Charles Davis

1946 births
Living people
Australian jazz flautists
Australian expatriates in Germany